Ellen Annette McArthur  (1862–1927) was a British economic historian.

Born on 19 June 1862 in Duffield, Derbyshire, McArthur was educated at Girton College, Cambridge, where she later became the tutor in history. In 1893 she became the first female lecturer at the University of Cambridge Local Examinations & Lectures Syndicate. She was the first woman to receive the degree of Doctor of Letters from the University of Dublin, under ad eundem arrangements (see steamboat ladies).

Among the publications she contributed to were Outlines of English Industrial History, Dictionary of Political Economy, and the English Historical Review.

McArthur died of illness on 4 September 1927. She never married and had no children. A monetary endowment created by her will at the University of Cambridge, the Ellen McArthur Fund, has supported lectures, research studentships, and other awards relating to economic history.

In 2017, she featured in a conference, London's Women Historians, held at the Institute of Historical Research.

See also 

Annie Abram
Steamboat ladies

References

Footnotes

Bibliography

External links 
The Ellen McArthur Lectures

1862 births
1927 deaths
People educated at St Leonards School
Alumni of Girton College, Cambridge
People associated with Westfield College
British historians
British women historians
Steamboat ladies